Nancy Elizabeth Lieberman (born July 1, 1958), nicknamed "Lady Magic", is an American former professional basketball player and coach in the Women's National Basketball Association (WNBA) who is currently a broadcaster for the Oklahoma City Thunder of the National Basketball Association (NBA) as well as the head coach of Power, a team in the BIG3 which she led to its 2018 Championship. Lieberman is regarded as one of the greatest figures in American women's basketball.

In 2000, she was inducted into the Nassau County Sports Hall of Fame. Lieberman is a member of the Naismith Memorial Basketball Hall of Fame, the Women's Basketball Hall of Fame, the St. Louis Jewish Sports Hall of Fame, and the Virginia Sports Hall of Fame.

Early life
Lieberman was born in Brooklyn, New York to Jerome and Renee Lieberman. She is Jewish (and described herself as "just a poor, skinny, redheaded Jewish girl from Queens"). Her family lived in Brooklyn when she was born, but soon moved to Far Rockaway, Queens, where she grew up with her older brother Clifford. She lost great-grandparents in the Holocaust, and her paternal grandparents, who survived, had concentration camp numbers on their wrists.

Her mother brought up the children after a separation and divorce. While growing up, she was interested in a variety of sports, playing baseball, softball and football with boys, before settling on basketball as her primary sport. She played basketball primarily on pickup teams with boys, not playing on a girls' team until she was a high school sophomore.

Lieberman's mother Renee was not supportive of her daughter's interest in basketball. Once, when Lieberman was practicing dribbling techniques indoors because it was cold outside, her mother demanded she stop dribbling because of all the noise. When she did not stop, her mother punctured the basketball with a screwdriver. Lieberman found another ball and continued, but her mother punctured that one as well. This continued until five balls were ruined. Lieberman then decided she had better go outside before she ran out of basketballs.

Playing career

High school career
While attending Far Rockaway High School in Queens, she established herself as one of the top women's basketball players in the country by earning one of the 12 coveted slots on the USA's National Team. In 1975, while still in her teens, Lieberman was named to the USA Team designated to play in the World Championships and Pan American Games, where the team won a gold medal.

During the school year, she played for her high school team, but in the summer, played with an Amateur Athletic Union team in Harlem, the New York Chuckles.

She told former Knick Walt Frazier that he was her hero and that it was because of him that she wore No. 10, saying: "You might not even know this, but you thought you were affecting young guys but you were affecting young, white Jewish women, not just boys."

College career
From 1976 to 1980, Lieberman attended Old Dominion University in Norfolk, Virginia, and played on the women's basketball team there. During that time, she and her team won two consecutive AIAW National Championships (1979, 1980) and one WNIT (Women's National Invitation Tournament) Championship in 1978. She was the first two-time winner of the prestigious Wade Trophy, a national player of the year award in college women's basketball, and was selected as the Broderick Award winner for basketball as the top women's player in America. Lieberman also won three consecutive Kodak All-America awards (1978, '79, '80). Lieberman was one of six young adults to win the Young American Award from the Boy Scouts of America in 1980.

Lieberman earned the nickname "Lady Magic," a nod to Earvin "Magic" Johnson of NBA fame. Lieberman set a school record for career assists (961) that still stands today. She led the team in assists each of the four years she was on the team—in her sophomore year she averaged 8.9 per game. Lieberman amassed 2,430 points along with 1,167 rebounds in her collegiate career, producing an average of 18.1 points per game. Lieberman achieved a triple double (40 points, 15 rebounds, 11 assists) against Norfolk State in her sophomore year. Lieberman stole the ball 562 times and assisted a basket 961 times in her college career, believed to be modern records. She is the holder of several single-game and single-season records, including best free-throw shooting percentage in her freshman and sophomore years.

Lieberman earned her degree in Interdisciplinary Studies from Old Dominion University on May 6, 1980. She was inducted into the ODU Sports Hall of Fame in 1985.

Professional career

In 1980 she was selected with the first pick in the Women's Pro Basketball League (WBL) draft by the Dallas Diamonds. She helped Dallas to the 1981 WBL finals, where they lost to the Nebraska Wranglers in five games. She was named the "rookie of the year", after averaging 26.3 points per game. Lieberman's WBL career is featured in the book Mad Seasons: The Story of the First Women's Professional Basketball League, 1978–1981.

In 1981, she played for the Los Angeles Lakers Summer Pro League team.

In 1984, she once again suited up for the Dallas Diamonds, signing a three-year, $250,000 contract with the team to play in the Women's American Basketball Association (WABA). Averaging 27 points per game and voted the league's Most Valuable Player, she helped Dallas win the 1984 WABA championship, but the league folded after the season. The final game played was between the Diamonds and the WABA All-Stars, where Lieberman scored 19 points and was named the game's MVP in the Diamonds' 101-94 victory.

In 1986, Lieberman signed with the Springfield Fame of the men's professional United States Basketball League (USBL) where she went on to average 1.7 points in 11 minutes per game. She remained in the league the following season, playing for the Long Island Knights. Later, she toured with the Washington Generals, who served as the regular opponent of the Harlem Globetrotters, where she met her future husband, teammate Tim Cline.

She was elected to the Basketball Hall of Fame as a player in 1996 and to the Women's Basketball Hall of Fame in 1999.

In the newly formed WNBA's inaugural year in 1997, Lieberman played for the Phoenix Mercury. At the age of 39, she was the WNBA's oldest player. On July 24, 2008, at 50 years old, Lieberman signed a seven-day contract with the Detroit Shock, breaking her own previous record as the oldest player in league history. She played one game and had two assists and two turnovers against the Houston Comets. The Comets defeated the Shock 79–61.

National team career
At age 17, Lieberman was named to the USA Basketball team roster. She played for the team in the 1975 USA Women's Pan American Team, three years younger than the next youngest teammates. The games were held in Mexico City, Mexico in October. The Pan Am team had failed to win the gold in 1967 and 1971. In 1975, the team was more successful, compiling a 7–0 record, and winning the gold medal for the first time since 1963.

Lieberman continued with the USA team to the 1976 Olympics in Montreal in the first women's Olympic basketball team competition. Shortly after turning 18, Lieberman became the youngest basketball player in Olympic history to win a medal, when the United States captured the silver medal.

Lieberman was named to the team representing the US at the 1979 William Jones Cup competition in Taipei. The USA team won all six games on the way to the gold medal. Lieberman earned a spot on the Jones Cup All-Tournament Team

Lieberman played with the team at the 1979 Pan American games in San Juan, Puerto Rico. Although the team easily won most of their games, they lost to Cuba, 91–86, and received the silver medal.

In 1980, Lieberman earned a slot on the 1980 Olympic team, but withdrew from the squad in support of U.S. President Jimmy Carter's boycott of the 1980 Summer Olympics in Moscow. She failed to make the final roster for the 1990 Goodwill Games and the 1992 Olympics.

Coaching career

WNBA
In 1998, Lieberman was hired as general manager and head coach of the WNBA's Detroit Shock. She coached for three seasons. After leaving the Shock, Lieberman worked as a women's basketball analyst on ESPN.

NBA G League
In November 2009, Lieberman became the coach of the Texas Legends in the NBA Development League (now NBA G League), an affiliate of the Dallas Mavericks, thus becoming the first woman to coach a professional men's basketball team. The team began play in November 2010. She later moved to a front office position with the Legends before joining Fox Sports Oklahoma as an analyst for the Oklahoma City Thunder studio show, Thunder Live.

NBA
In July 2015, she was hired by the Sacramento Kings as an assistant coach, becoming the second female assistant coach in NBA history. She took two leaves of absence to care for her ailing mother before leaving the Kings in 2017. After the Kings, she became a broadcaster with the New Orleans Pelicans.

BIG3
On March 21, 2018, it was announced that Lieberman was hired as a head coach of Power in the BIG3 league, replacing Clyde Drexler. In her first season as head coach, she led her team to the 2018 Championship, defeating 3's Company to become the first ever female coach in the BIG3 to win a championship.

Career statistics

College

Source

WNBA

Regular season

Source

|-
| style="text-align:left;"| 1997
| style="text-align:left;"| Phoenix
| 25 || 0 || 11.2 || .325 || .231 || .800 || 1.3 || 1.6 || 0.6 || 0.1 || 1.6 || 2.6
|-
| style="text-align:left;"| 2008
| style="text-align:left;"| Detroit
| 1 || 0 || 9.0 || .000 || – || – || 0.0 || 2.0 || 0.0 || 0.0 || 2.0 || 0.0
|-
| align="left" | Career
| 2 years, 2 teams
| 26 || 0 || 11.1 || .321 || .231 || .800 || 1.2 || 1.6 || 0.5 || 0.1 || 1.6 || 2.5
|}

Playoffs

|-
| style="text-align:left;"| 1997
| style="text-align:left;"| Phoenix
| 1 || 0 || 1.0 || – || – || – || 0.0 || 0.0 || 0.0 || 1.0 || 0.0 || 0.0
|}

Awards and honors
 1979-Winner of the Honda Sports Award for basketball
 1979-The Honda-Broderick Cup winner for all sports.
 1980-Winner of the Honda Sports Award for basketball
 1999-Inducted into the Women's Basketball Hall of Fame
 2000-Nancy Lieberman Award created
 2022-Statue of her unveiled at Old Dominion University; the first statue of a former ODU athlete at the university

Personal life
in 1988, Lieberman married one of her teammates with the Generals, Tim Cline, taking the surname Lieberman-Cline until the couple's divorce on March 15, 2001.

Their son Timothy Joseph or T. J., played college basketball for the Richmond Spiders, and in November 2017 signed to play for Israeli team Hapoel Holon, which plays in the Ligat HaAl, the top division of Israeli basketball.

In regard to religious matters, despite her Jewish upbringing, Lieberman became a Christian late in her life and was described as having embraced born-again Christianity and a 2015 Jerusalem Post article. Nonetheless, she said in an interview in 2010, "I am 100% Jewish. My father's parents were deeply religious, we had two sets of silverware when we went and ate over there. My mother's side observed the major holidays. It was more relaxed. I went to Hebrew school as well." In 2011, she visited Israel with her mother, saying "It has changed my outlook of Israel. I know as a Jewish woman how important it is for me to be connected to this culture and to this community."

Lieberman was a contestant on the season 4 Gold Medal Challenge of Champions special of American Gladiators. She was eliminated after the third event with the lowest score of the three female competitors.

On August 13, 2008, she was part of the inaugural class to be inducted into the Hampton Roads Sports Hall of Fame, honoring athletes, coaches and administrators who made contributions to sports in Southeastern Virginia.

See also 
 List of female NBA coaches
 Nancy Lieberman Award
 List of select Jewish basketball players
 WBCBL Professional Basketball Trailblazer Award

Notes

References

External links
 Official website
 Biography on Jewish Women Encyclopedia
 Lieberman articles on ESPN.com
 Profile on Women's basketball Hall of Fame
 Profile on Naismith Memorial Basketball Hall of Fame

1958 births
Living people
21st-century American Jews
21st-century American women
All-American college women's basketball players
American evangelicals
American Gladiators contestants
American men's basketball coaches
American women's basketball coaches
American women's basketball players
Basketball coaches from New York (state)
Basketball players at the 1975 Pan American Games
Basketball players at the 1976 Summer Olympics
Basketball players at the 1979 Pan American Games
Basketball players from New York City
Big3 coaches
Christians from New York (state)
Converts to evangelical Christianity
Detroit Shock head coaches
Detroit Shock players
Far Rockaway High School alumni
Jewish American sportspeople
Jewish women's basketball players
Medalists at the 1976 Summer Olympics
Medalists at the 1979 Pan American Games
Naismith Memorial Basketball Hall of Fame inductees
National Basketball Association broadcasters
Old Dominion Monarchs women's basketball players
Olympic silver medalists for the United States in basketball
Pan American Games gold medalists for the United States
Pan American Games medalists in basketball
Pan American Games silver medalists for the United States
People from Far Rockaway, Queens
Phoenix Mercury draft picks
Phoenix Mercury players
Point guards
Sacramento Kings assistant coaches
Sportspeople from Brooklyn
Sportspeople from Queens, New York
Texas Legends coaches
United States Basketball League players
United States women's national basketball team players
Washington Generals players
Women sports announcers
Women's National Basketball Association executives
Women's National Basketball Association general managers
Women's Professional Basketball League players
Women's Sports Foundation executives